Kristine Duvholt Havnås (born 31 January 1974) is a former Norwegian team handball player and World Champion. She was born in Tønsberg. She received a silver medal at the 1992 Summer Olympics in Barcelona. She received a bronze medal at the 2000 Summer Olympics in Sydney. 
She was voted into the All star team at the 1999 World Championship.

References

External links

1974 births
Living people
Norwegian female handball players
Olympic handball players of Norway
Handball players at the 1992 Summer Olympics
Handball players at the 1996 Summer Olympics
Handball players at the 2000 Summer Olympics
Sportspeople from Tønsberg
Olympic silver medalists for Norway
Olympic bronze medalists for Norway
Olympic medalists in handball
Medalists at the 2000 Summer Olympics
Medalists at the 1992 Summer Olympics
20th-century Norwegian women